Arnould de Vuez (1644, Saint-Omer - 1720) was a painter of Flemish origin active in Lille from 1680 to 1720.

Life

Family and training 
Arnould de Vuez was born in 1644 in Saint-Omer. His father served as a soldier in order to feed his 8 children. Arnould left his birthplace for Paris to perfect his painting technique in the studio of Luc, a Récollet monk. He then moved to live with his uncle, a canon at Venice then Rome, where he won first prize for drawing at the Accademia di San Luca.

Career 
Back in Paris, Arnould was under the protection of Charles Le Brun at the court of Louis XIV. A may at Notre Dame de Paris commissioned Arnould to paint "The Incredulity of St Thomas", held since the French Revolution at the primatiale st Jean de Lyon. On Lebrun's death Arnould established himself in Lille for fifty years, and the town was to offer him many opportunities. Since its conquest by Louis XIV the town was newly being redeveloped (Vauban built the citadel there) and Arnould de Vuez received commissions from religious institutions in the town and its surroundings, including the Hospice Comtesse and the Carmelites at Lille, the Carmelites at Douai, the Benedictines at Marchiennes and the Jesuits at Cambrai. His style was strongly influenced by the Italian Renaissance and the sense of colour in Flemish artists like Rubens and Anthony van Dyck.

The artwork glued to the wall was hidden during occupation of Paris probably. It's reproduced as a rotogravure in the 1900 book by Albert Vandal Odyssey of an Ambassador: The Travels of the Marquis de Nointel, 1670-1680.

Selected works 
 Allegory of the alliance of the dauphin of France with Maria Anna of Bavaria, Louvre, oil on canvas, de Vuez's academy piece
 Saint Zita, oil on canvas (c 1696), Palais des Beaux-Arts de Lille 
 Incredulity of St Thomas, oil on canvas, Primatiale Saint-Jean de Lyon (Lyon Cathedral)
 Saint Cecilia accompanied by three angel musicians, Palais des Beaux-Arts de Lille
 Adoration of the shepherds, oil on canvas, Église Saint-Étienne, Lille   
 Mourning Virgin, oil on canvas, Palais des Beaux-Arts de Lille  
 St Francis of Assisi receiving the stigmata, oil on canvas, Palais des Beaux-Arts de Lille 
 Baldwin V of Hainaut and Marguerite d'Alsace, oil on canvas, Musée de l'Hospice Comtesse, Lille 
 Charles the Bold, oil on canvas, Musée de l'Hospice Comtesse, Lille 
 Charity, oil on canvas, Musée de l'Hospice Comtesse, Lille
 Faith, oil on canvas, Musée de l'Hospice Comtesse, Lille 
 Martyrdom of Saint Ursula, oil on canvas, Musée de l'Hospice Comtesse, Lille
 Presentation of the Virgin, oil on canvas, tableau du maitre hotel, Musée de l'Hospice Comtesse, Lille
 Assumption of the Virgin, oil on canvas, Musée de l'Hospice Comtesse, Lille
 Mary of Burgundy, wife of Maximilian I of Austria, oil on canvas, Musée de l'Hospice Comtesse, Lille
 Marquis de Nointel entering the city of Jerusalem, 1674, oil on canvas, Oscar de la Renta boutique, Paris

References

1644 births
1720 deaths
People from Saint-Omer
17th-century French painters
French male painters
18th-century French painters
18th-century French male artists